As of January 2023, Arizona's registered voters include 1,443,142 Republicans (34.7%), 1,270,613 Democrats (30.5%), 32,961 Libertarians (0.8%), and 1,415,020 "Other" (34.0%).

State politics
Most political offices are currently held by members of the Republican Party. Both U.S. Senators and 5 of out the 9 House of Representatives members are Democrats, (the other four are Republicans) Many were first elected in the 2018 elections. The following table indicates the political parties of elected officials in Arizona:

Governor
Secretary of State
Attorney General
State Treasurer
Superintendent of Public Instruction
State Mine Inspector

The table also indicates the historical party composition in the:
State Senate
State House of Representatives
State Corporation Commission
State delegation to the U.S. Senate
State delegation to the U.S. House of Representatives

For years in which a presidential election was held, the table indicates which party's nominees received the state's electoral votes.

Pre-statehood (1863–1911)

1912–present

See also
Law and government in Arizona

Notes

Politics of Arizona
Government of Arizona
Arizona